St. Joseph Catholic Church is a parish of the Roman Catholic Church in Jasper, Dubois County, Indiana, in the Diocese of Evansville. It is noted for its historic church located at 1215 N. Newton Street.

The community was founded in 1837 by Fr. Joseph Kundek, a missionary priest from Croatia, and met in a log cabin before moving to a brick structure in 1841. The current church was built through the efforts of Fr. Fidelis Maute, OSB, who served as architect and builder as well as pastor. Work began in 1867 and was completed in 1880, and the building was consecrated in 1888.

Architecture
The church is a large, Romanesque Revival style, solid sandstone block building. It features a large stone bell tower and steeple measuring 235 feet high. It was added to the National Register of Historic Places in 1980.

Gallery

References

External links
 

Churches in the Roman Catholic Diocese of Evansville
Churches on the National Register of Historic Places in Indiana
Romanesque Revival church buildings in Indiana
Roman Catholic churches completed in 1880
Religious organizations established in 1837
Churches in Dubois County, Indiana
Jasper, Indiana
National Register of Historic Places in Dubois County, Indiana
20th-century Roman Catholic church buildings in the United States